A list of notable politicians of the Bavarian People's Party:

A
 Hans Adlhoch
 Alois Albert
 Ellen Ammann

B
 Klara Barth
 Joseph Baumgartner
 Konrad Beyerle
 Karl Bickleder
 Otto Bohl

D
 Hans Demmelmeier
 Kaspar Deutschenbaur

E
 Erich Emminger
 Franz Ritter von Epp
 Georg Escherich

F
 Conrad Fink
 Gustav Fuchs

G
 Alfons Goppel

H
 Heinrich Held
 Alois Hundhammer

L
 Hugo Graf von und zu Lerchenfeld auf Köfering und Schönberg
 Hans Ritter von Lex

M
 Franz Matt
 Nikolaus Müller

R
 Hans Rauch

S
 Fritz Schäffer
 Karl Scharnagl
 Hanns Seidel
 Ludwig Siebert
 Karl Graf von Spreti

W
 Otto Weinkamm

 
Bavarian People's Party